Sir James Everard Home, 2nd Baronet,  (25 October 1798, Well Manor, Hampshire, England – 1 November 1853, Sydney, New South Wales, Australia) was an eminent nineteenth century British naval officer.

From 1 February 1834 to 5 December 1837, he was commander of the 18-gun sloop , serving in the West Indies.

From 30 August 1841 to 8 September 1846 he was captain of the corvette HMS North Star. During the period 1841-42 she served at Canton with Sir William Parker's ships in the First Anglo-Chinese War (1839–42), known popularly as the First Opium War. On 23 March 1845, North Star arrived in New Zealand. North Star operated in the Bay of Islands during the Flagstaff War between 11 March 1845 and 11 January 1846. On 30 April 1845, Pōmare was taken on board North Star and, following the burning of his pā, to Auckland. He was released after Tāmati Wāka Nene's intervention.

From 28 November 1850, he was Captain of the 28-gun sixth rate HMS Calliope until he died in Sydney on 2 November 1853.

A memorial plaque to him is in St James' Church, Sydney.

See also
Everard Home

References

1798 births
1853 deaths
Baronets in the Baronetage of the United Kingdom
Royal Navy officers
Royal Navy personnel of the New Zealand Wars
British military personnel of the New Zealand Wars
19th-century New Zealand military personnel
Flagstaff War
Companions of the Order of the Bath
18th-century English people
19th-century English people
Fellows of the Royal Society